Mohan Singh Rawat is an Indian politician and member of the Bharatiya Janata Party. Rawat was a member of the Uttarakhand Legislative Assembly from the Pauri constituency in Pauri Garhwal district.

References 

People from Pauri Garhwal district
Bharatiya Janata Party politicians from Uttarakhand
Members of the Uttarakhand Legislative Assembly
Living people
21st-century Indian politicians
Year of birth missing (living people)